Alone is the forty-fourth studio album by guitarist Chet Atkins. It peaked at number 42 on the Billboard Country Album charts.

It was during the recording of this album that Chet was first diagnosed with colon cancer.

Reissues 
 In 1989, RCA/Mobile Fidelity Sound Labs reissued Pickin' My Way, Chet Atkins in Hollywood and Alone in a double CD set.

Track listing

Side one 
 "Hawaiian Slack Key" – 2:35
 "The Claw" (Jerry Reed) – 2:16
 "Spanish Fandango" (Traditional) – 2:01
 "Flop Eared Mule and Other Classics"
 "Over the Waves" (Juventino Rosas) – 2:30
 "Just as I Am" (William B. Bradbury, Charlotte Elliott) – 1:25

Side two 
 "Take Five" (Paul Desmond) – 2:28
 "Smile" (Charlie Chaplin) – 2:42
 "Blue Finger" – 2:36
 "Me and Bobby McGee" (Fred Foster, Kris Kristofferson) – 2:30
 "Londonderry Air" (arrangement: Atkins) – 2:58
 "The Watkins Man" – 2:47

Personnel 
 Chet Atkins - guitar, arrangements
Production notes
 Paul Yandell – arrangement - with Chet Atkins ("The Watkins Man")
 Jorge Morel – arrangement ("Take Five")
 Bill Vandevort – engineer
 Mike Shockley – recording technician
 Jimmy Moore – cover photo

References 

Chet Atkins albums
1973 albums
RCA Records albums